The New Zealand national handball team is the national handball team of New Zealand and is controlled by the New Zealand Handball Federation.

Results

Oceania Nations Cup

Asian Championship

Pacific Cup

Team

Current squad 
Squad for the 2020 Asian Men's Handball Championship.

Head Coach: Frederic Han

Coaching/supporting staff

References

External links

IHF profile

Handball in New Zealand
Men's national handball teams
Handball